The women's 60 metres hurdles event  at the 1987 IAAF World Indoor Championships was held at the Hoosier Dome in Indianapolis on 6 and 7 March.

Medalists

Results

Heats
The first 2 of each heat (Q) and next 4 fastest (q) qualified for the final.

Final

References

60
60 metres hurdles at the World Athletics Indoor Championships